Elías Josué Borrego (born 19 July 1990) is an Argentine professional footballer who plays as a midfielder for Chilean Segunda División club Deportes Limache. He previously played for Colegiales in Argentina (2009–2013).

References

External links
 

1990 births
Living people
Footballers from Buenos Aires
Argentine footballers
Association football midfielders
Club Atlético Colegiales (Argentina) players
San Luis de Quillota footballers
Club Atlético Douglas Haig players
Club Olimpo footballers
Ferro Carril Oeste footballers
Atlético Venezuela C.F. players
Defensores de Belgrano footballers
Deportes Limache footballers
Primera B Metropolitana players
Primera Nacional players
Primera B de Chile players
Segunda División Profesional de Chile players
Argentine expatriate footballers
Argentine expatriate sportspeople in Chile
Expatriate footballers in Chile